The  is a Go competition in Japan or a title of the competition's winner.

Outline
Gosei is a Go competition used by the Japanese Nihon Ki-in and Kansai Ki-in. It is one of the seven big titles in Japan, although it pays much less than the top three. The winner's prize is 8,000,000 yen. Gosei uses the same format as the other big seven. The winner of the knockout tournament faces the title holder in a best of five match. There is one restriction that the other titles don't have, and that is to be able to enter the Gosei tournament, a player must be at least 5 dan.

The promotion rules are just like the Judan's. If the player gets to challenge the title holder, they are promoted to 7 dan. If that player wins the title match, they are promoted to 8 dan.  If the player subsequently wins another of the second tier top titles (Gosei, Judan, Oza, Tengen), the player will be promoted to 9 dan.

Winners and runners-up

See also
 Honorary Gosei

References

External links
 Nihon Ki-in archive (in Japanese)
 Gosei title games

Go competitions in Japan